Villadossola (Piedmontese Vila d'Òssola) is a town and comune of the Val d’Ossola in the Province of Verbano-Cusio-Ossola, Piedmont, northern Italy, some  northeast of Turin. It stands just south of Domodossola, to the west of the Toce, and at the mouth of the picturesque Valle Antrona, one of the seven side valleys of the Val d’Ossola.

In the past this was an important centre for the iron and steel, and chemical industries. Today the local economy is focused on the tertiary sector and many of the industrial buildings have been converted to other uses: the town's theatre, La Fabbrica, is based in a former factory.

Villadossola borders the following communes: Beura-Cardezza, Borgomezzavalle, Domodossola, Montescheno, Pallanzeno.

Twin towns — sister cities
Villadossola is twinned with:

  Mercato Saraceno, Italy, since 2010

References

External links
 Official website

Cities and towns in Piedmont